An Almost Funny Story  is a  1977 Soviet two-part television film directed by Pyotr Fomenko.

Plot 
The love story of two already middle-aged people. Two sisters come to a small town on the Volga to rest. One is about fifty, the other is a little younger. They get acquainted with the most ordinary business trip, who does not at all understand that the youngest of the sisters, a little eccentric, fell in love with him at first sight.

Cast
 Olga Antonova as Illaria Pavlovna 
 Lyudmila Arinina as Taisia Pavlovna, Illaria's sister  
 Mikhail Gluzsky as Viktor  Meshkov   
 Valentin Gaft as fellow traveler on the train
 Maria Mironova as  telegraph operator
 Svetlana Kharitonova as conductor
 Lyudmila Polyakova as  a client at the hairdresser
 Boris Leskin as TV master

The songs are performed by Sergey Nikitin and Tatyana Nikitina.

Production
Filming took place in Yaroslavl, Plyos, Odessa, and Moscow.

References

External links 
 

1977 films
1970s Russian-language films
Soviet romantic comedy films
Soviet television films
1977 romantic comedy films
Studio Ekran films